Jeff Parke (born March 23, 1982) is an American former soccer player. He played 11 seasons in Major League Soccer, appearing in over 250 matches.

Youth

Parke played for powerhouse youth club FC Delco. He then played four years of college soccer at Drexel University.

Professional

New York
Parke was drafted by the MetroStars with 60th and last overall pick of the 2004 MLS SuperDraft. He played in the 2005 pre-season, scoring the game-winning goal against Norway's Viking FK in the 2005 La Manga Cup, which helped him earn a starting spot on the MLS team. He remained an important part of the team's defense in 2005 and 2006, quickly becoming one of the team's stalwarts on the back line. In 2006, he started a career-high 31 games, was named Red Bulls' Ironman of the Year for logging in a team-high 2,771 minutes, and was named Co-Unsung Player of the Year by members of the soccer media, sharing that honor with Seth Stammler. In 2007 Parke continued to be a fixture in the Red Bull lineup, appearing in 28 matches including 27 starts. In 2008, he appeared in 24 league matches for New York Red Bulls.

Other MLS clubs
On November 26, 2008, Parke was selected by Seattle Sounders FC in the third round of the 2008 MLS Expansion Draft, but he chose not to sign with Seattle. Instead, on March 31, 2009, Parke signed a one-year contract with the Vancouver Whitecaps of the USL First Division.

In May 2010, Parke did sign with Seattle. He remained with the club for three seasons and was voted Seattle's defender of the year in both 2011 and 2012. In December 2012, Parke was traded to his hometown side Philadelphia Union in exchange for a 2013 MLS Supplemental Draft pick and allocation money.

On January 14, 2014, Parke was traded to D.C. United in exchange for Ethan White. Parke played only 13 games for the club, before a combination of foot injuries and migraines requiring inner-ear surgery sidelined him for the rest of the season.

International
On January 5, 2012, Parke was called into camp for the United States men's national soccer team in preparation for friendly matches against Venezuela and Panama. He made his international debut against Panama, coming on in the 55th minute for Chris Wondolowski after Geoff Cameron received a red card.

Drug controversy
On October 16, 2008, Parke, along with goalkeeper Jon Conway, was suspended for 10 matches each and fined 10 percent of their annual salaries after testing positive for a banned performance-enhancing drug. Parke and Conway tested positive for androstenedione (ATD) and boldenone metabolites, two banned performance-enhancing steroids, after taking an over-the-counter supplement they purchased at The Vitamin Shoppe. The suspensions are currently the longest in MLS history.

Career statistics

Honors

New York Red Bulls
Major League Soccer Western Conference Championship (1): 2008

Seattle Sounders FC
Lamar Hunt U.S. Open Cup (2): 2010, 2011

See also
Drexel Dragons

References

External links
 
 

1982 births
Living people
American soccer players
American expatriate soccer players
Drexel Dragons men's soccer players
New York Red Bulls players
Vancouver Whitecaps (1986–2010) players
Seattle Sounders FC players
Philadelphia Union players
D.C. United players
Association football defenders
Soccer players from Pennsylvania
New York Red Bulls draft picks
Expatriate soccer players in Canada
Major League Soccer players
USL First Division players
United States men's international soccer players
Doping cases in association football
People from Downingtown, Pennsylvania